The Cheltenham torso mystery began with the discovery of the torso of an unknown man in the River Severn in 1938.  Forensic analysis by Sir Bernard Spilsbury suggested that the body was that of Captain Butt of Cheltenham but the case was never officially resolved.

A man's torso was found by fishermen in the Severn near Haw Bridge, Tewkesbury, Gloucestershire on 3 February 1938.  Dragging the river turned up two legs and two handless arms.  The body was thought to be that of Captain William Bernard Butt, aged 52, of 248, Old Bath Road, Cheltenham, who had been missing since January.  Sir Bernard Spilsbury carried out a post-mortem on the torso and other remains: he considered that they were parts of the same body and found several points of similarity with the missing Captain. Dr Roche Lynch also assisted in the investigation.

Brian Sullivan, a 27-year-old dancer, the son of a nurse who looked after Butt's invalid wife, had committed suicide at his mother's home at Tower Lodge, Leckhampton, a few days after the Captain's disappearance and his blood-stained overcoat was found under the floorboards there.

Extensive searches failed to find the head and hands of the body, and the inquest left the identity of the remains and cause of death officially undetermined.

References

External links
 photograph of the Cheltenham Torso Murder Mystery, taken in February 1938

1938 in England
Crime in Gloucestershire
Unsolved murders in England
20th century in Gloucestershire
1938 murders in the United Kingdom